Mark Richard van der Zijden (born 22 October 1973 in Boskoop, South Holland) is a former freestyle and medley swimmer from the Netherlands, who swam in the qualifying heats of the bronze winning 4×200 m freestyle relay team at the 2000 Summer Olympics in Sydney, Australia. Four years earlier, when Atlanta, Georgia hosted the Games, Van der Zijden became seventh in the same event.

References
 

1973 births
Living people
Olympic swimmers of the Netherlands
Swimmers at the 1996 Summer Olympics
Swimmers at the 2000 Summer Olympics
Olympic bronze medalists for the Netherlands
People from Boskoop
Olympic bronze medalists in swimming
Dutch male freestyle swimmers
World Aquatics Championships medalists in swimming
European Aquatics Championships medalists in swimming
Medalists at the 2000 Summer Olympics